Everything I Don't Remember is a 2015 novel by Swedish writer Jonas Hassen Khemiri.
Main characters are Samuel, Laide, Vandad, and "The Panther". The book is a reconstruction of the last years of Samuel's life, before his death in a car crash. In the book, the author transcribed his interviews with Laide, Vandad, "The Panther" and other people who he came across, for example his grandmother's neighbour and also a nurse who assisted said grandmother. At the end of the book, the reader understands that the author chose to write this book as a way to cope with a loss of his own. 
It won the August Prize in 2015

References

2015 Swedish novels
Swedish-language novels
Novels set in Stockholm
August Prize-winning works
Novels by Jonas Hassen Khemiri
Albert Bonniers Förlag books